Bukit Panjang Government High School (BPGHS) is a co-educational government autonomous secondary school in Choa Chu Kang, Singapore.

History

BPGHS was formed in 1960 with the merging of Bukit Panjang Secondary School and Chua Chu Kang Government Chinese Middle School into a single school building at Jalan Teck Whye. It was the first integrated government school in Singapore. The spirit of the school's beginning is described on the cover of the first school magazine: "Dominating the Bukit Panjang horizon are the twin peaks of Bukit Panjang—two peaks but one hill—symbolic of the integrated Chinese and English streams of education which work and play together as one in the valley below."

BPGHS, which was the first secondary school to be opened in the West Zone, was officially opened by Education Minister Yong Nyuk Lin on 11 January 1960. Sun Y-Chern was the first principal of the school. The first annual school sports meet was organised in 1960 and in the same year, the first batch of English stream students sat for their Cambridge School Certificate Examinations. The Chinese Stream Higher School Certificate classes were started in 1963 and the first batch of Chinese stream candidates sat for the Government Higher School Certificate and Government Secondary Four School Certificate Examinations in 1964.

In 1967, the School Advisory Committee was formed. The school continued to make great strides in the academic field. In 1970, the school obtained 93.6% passes in the Chinese School Certificate Exams — the highest among all integrated schools. The Chinese Higher School Certificate results were second only to that of National Junior College.

The ECA block was completed in June 1976 and was officially opened by Chai Chong Yi, Senior Minister of State for Education. In 1979, the school started an audio-corner and SELP classes to help students improve their English proficiency. The school band also won the prestigious gold medal award and the Mace of Honour at the 1979 and 1983 Inter-School Band Competitions.

In the 1980s, English streams were adopted nationwide. BPGHS worked on improving the standard of English in the school, which seen by the percentage of GCE Ordinary Level passes in English increasing from below 50% to 98% in 1995. Education Minister Lee Yock Suan announced in 1993 that the school was one of the six schools to be granted autonomous status in 1994 and that it would be offering Higher Chinese and Higher Malay from 1995.

In 1993, the school moved from its old premises at Jalan Teck Whye to its present site at 7 Choa Chu Kang Avenue 4. The new school building was officially opened on 15 July 1995 by Low Seow Chay, Member of Parliament for Choa Chu Kang SMC. The school moved to a holding site between November 2006 and 2 January 2009 located at 38 Teck Whye Crescent as the campus at Choa Chu Kang was being upgraded under the Ministry of Education's PRIME scheme.

Notable alumni
 Cheng Li Hui, member of parliament for Tampines GRC
 Eelyn Kok, actress
 Law Song Seng, former director and chief executive officer of the Institute of Technical Education
 Shawn Lee, actor
 Masagos Zulkifli, Cabinet minister and member of parliament for Tampines GRC
 Saiyidah Aisyah, Olympic rower
 Sim Wong Hoo, founder and executive chairman of Creative Technology
 Yaw Shin Leong, former member of parliament for Hougang SMC, 2011-2012

References

External links
 Official Website

Autonomous schools in Singapore
Secondary schools in Singapore
Choa Chu Kang
Educational institutions established in 1960
1960 establishments in Malaya